Eber Sanhueza Rojas (born 23 April 1998) is a Chilean rower who competed in the men's lightweight double skulls event at the 2020 Summer Olympics.

Career
Sanhueza was set to compete at the 2016 World Championships, but he was pulled from the competition to replace an injured Chilean teammate at the 2016 World U23 Championships, placing tenth in the coxless four event.

At the 2018 South American Games, he won a gold medal in the lightweight double skulls with Felipe Cárdenas and a silver medal in the quadruple skulls with Cárdenas, César Abaroa, and Bernardo Guerrero.

Sanhueza began competing with César Abaroa in the lightweight double skulls event in 2017. They finished seventh at the 2017 World U23 Championships, and improved to a fourth-place finish at the 2018 edition. The pair placed 20th at the 2018 World Championships in Bulgaria, then won a bronze medal at the 2019 Pan American Games in Peru.

In March 2021, Sanhueza and Abaroa finished second in the lightweight double skulls event at the American Olympic Qualification Regatta, securing Chile's boat in the event at the delayed 2020 Summer Olympics. A few days later the Chilean Rowing Federation selected the duo ahead of Felipe Cárdenas, who also finished second in his single skulls race, for the Olympic slot.

References

External links
 
 

Living people
1998 births
Chilean male rowers
Olympic rowers of Chile
Rowers at the 2020 Summer Olympics
Pan American Games bronze medalists for Chile
Pan American Games medalists in rowing
Medalists at the 2019 Pan American Games
South American Games gold medalists for Chile
South American Games silver medalists for Chile
South American Games medalists in rowing
Competitors at the 2018 South American Games
Andrés Bello National University alumni
People from Puerto Montt
21st-century Chilean people